The S2 is a commuter rail route forming part of the Milan suburban railway service, which converges on the city of Milan, Italy.

The service operates over the Milan–Asso and Milan Passante lines.  Like all other Milan suburban railway service routes, it is operated by Trenord.

Route 

S2, a cross-city route, heads initially in a southwesterly direction from Mariano Comense to Seveso, and then south to Milano Bovisa-Politecnico.  From there, the line runs across the municipality of Milan, via the Milan Passante railway, to Milano Rogoredo. The journey takes 1h08'.

History
The S2 was introduced on 12 December 2004, and operated initially between Mariano Comense and Milano Porta Vittoria.

With the change of timetable on 15 June 2008, the service was extended from Milano Porta Vittoria to Milano Rogoredo, where there is interchange with regional trains and long-distance services to and from Genoa, Bologna and Mantua.

The initial plans for the service foresaw a further extension from Milano Rogoredo to Pavia, but that has not materialized: Pavia has since been connected to the suburban railway service by the new S13.

Stations 
The stations on the S2 are as follows (stations with blue background are in the municipality of Milan):

See also 

 History of rail transport in Italy
 List of Milan suburban railway stations
 Rail transport in Italy
 Transport in Milan

References

External links
 ATM  – official site 
 Trenord – official site 
 Schematic of Line S2 – schematic depicting all stations on Line S2

This article is based upon a translation of the Italian language version as at November 2012.

Milan S Lines